Zsolt Kunyik (born 23 April 1974 in Tatabánya) is a Hungarian former judoka who competed in the 1996 Summer Olympics.

References

1974 births
Living people
People from Tatabánya
Hungarian male judoka
Olympic judoka of Hungary
Judoka at the 1996 Summer Olympics
Sportspeople from Komárom-Esztergom County
20th-century Hungarian people